Bartholomew Barrett (4 June 1906 – 8 March 1974), known as Battna Barrett, was an Irish hurler who played at club level with Glen Rovers and at inter-county level with the Cork senior hurling team. He usually lined out as a forward.

Playing career

Barrett first made an impression as a hurler with the Glen Rovers club. He eventually progressed onto the club's senior team and won six consecutive Cork SHC titles between 1934 and 1939 during a golden age for the Glen. Barrett's skill at club level brought him to the attention of the Cork senior hurling team and he made his first appearance on the inter-county scene in 1934. He scored four goals on his debut against Tipperary. Barrett continued to line out with Cork until 1936.

Personal life and death

Barrett was born in Shanon on Cork's northside, the eldest surviving son of Stephen and Hannah (née Courtney). After completing his education, he worked as a rubber worker with Dunlop's. Barrett married Margaret Hegarty in January 1944. He died at St Stephen's Hospital in Glanmire on 8 March 1974.

Honours

Glen Rovers
Cork Senior Hurling Championship: 1934, 1935, 1936, 1937, 1938, 1939

References

1906 births
1974 deaths
Glen Rovers hurlers
Cork inter-county hurlers
Sportspeople from Cork (city)